Tamara Klink ( Kogan, also Girkiyan-Klink, born 27 April 1967) is a German chess player who holds the FIDE title of Woman Grandmaster (WGM, 2000). She previously played for the Soviet Union (until 1991), Russia (1992–1993), and Kazakhstan (1993–2001).

Biography
In 1988, Tamara Klink participated in USSR Women's Chess Championship final and ranked in 13th place. In 1991, in Leningrad she ranked 7th in FIDE Zonal chess tournament. After dissolution of the Soviet Union Klink played for Russia and Kazakhstan.

Klink played for Kazakhstan in the Women's Chess Olympiads:
 In 1994, at first reserve board in the 31st Chess Olympiad (women) in Moscow (+5, =2, -2),
 In 1996, at third board in the 32nd Chess Olympiad (women) in Yerevan (+4, =4, -3),
 In 1998, at first board in the 33rd Chess Olympiad (women) in Elista (+4, =7, -2),
 In 2000, at second board in the 34th Chess Olympiad (women) in Istanbul (+5, =3, -5).

Since 2000, Klink lives in Germany, and since 2001, she represents this country in chess tournaments. She was medalist of international chess tournaments in Kassel in 2000, in which she shared the 3rd-10th place, and in Baunatal in 2000, in which she shared the 2nd-3rd place. With OSG chess club Baden-Baden Tamara Klink multiple times won Chess Women's Bundesliga (2003, 2004, 2005, 2008, 2011, 2012). In 2002, with this club, she participated in the European Women's Chess Club Cup.

In 1995, she received the FIDE Woman International Master (WIM) title and received the FIDE Woman Grandmaster (WGM) title five years later.

References

External links

1967 births
Living people
People from Shymkent
German female chess players
Kazakhstani female chess players
Russian female chess players
Soviet female chess players
Chess woman grandmasters
Chess Olympiad competitors